The Leyenda de Plata (Spanish for "the Silver Legend") is an annual lucha libre tournament held by the Mexican professional wrestling promotion Consejo Mundial de Lucha Libre (CMLL) since 1998. The tournament honors El Santo, Enmáscarado de Plata (the Silver mask) and has been held every year since 1998 except for 2003 when El Hijo del Santo (El Santo's son) did not work for CMLL. CMLL still holds the annual tournament despite the fact that El Hijo del Santo no longer works for CMLL. It is the most prestigious of all of CMLL's annual tournaments.

The original format of the tournament was the Torneo cibernetico to qualify for a semi-final. The winner of the semi-final faces the winner of the previous year's tournament in the final. Since 2005 CMLL has held two cibernetico matches and the winner of each then meet in the semi-final. In 2011, the tournament was modified to eliminate the final stage. The winner is given a plaque with a solid silver El Santo mask on it. Only two wrestlers have won Leyend de Plata more than once, Místico won it in 2006, 2007 and 2008 and Negro Casas in 2000, 2014 and 2015. After a two-year hiatus, the tournament returned in 2011.

Tournament winners

References

 
Consejo Mundial de Lucha Libre tournaments
Recurring events established in 1998
Events in Mexico City